Ahmad-Reza Shafiei-Jam  (born July 1, 1971) is an Iranian  actor . He is famous for his roles in comedy TV series and films.

Filmography

Cinema
 Mard-e Avazi (The Changed Man)
 Ertefa'-e Past (Low Height)
 Soorati
 Joojeh Ordak-e Man (My Duckling)
 Zan-e Badali (The Changed Woman)
 Faza Navardan (The Astronauts)
 Ghelghelak  (The Tickle)
 Charchanguli
 Efratiha (Fanatics)
 Wai Ampoul

Televisio 
 Saat-e Khosh (A good time)
 In chand nafar (These several persons) Koocheh Aghaghia (Acacia Alley) Noghteh-chin (Dotting)—Bamshad
 Bedoon-e sharh (Without Description) Jayezeh-ye Bozorg (Grand Prize)—Kambiz
 Shabhaye Barareh (Barareh nights)—Keivoon
 Baghe Mozaffar (Mozaffar's garden)—Gholmorad
 Torsh va Shirin (Sour And Sweet) SMS from another World Char Khooneh (Plaid)''—Hamed

See also
Mehran Modiri
Javad Razavian
Mohammad Reza Hedayati
Siamak Ansari

References

External links

1971 births
Living people
Iranian comedians
People from Tehran
Iranian male actors
Iranian male film actors
Iranian stand-up comedians
Iranian male television actors